The 1982 New York Jets season was the 23rd season for the franchise and its 13th in the National Football League. It began with the team trying to improve upon its 10–5–1 record from 1981 and return to the playoffs under head coach Walt Michaels. The season was marred by an eight-week players’ strike, cancelling eight scheduled games (one game was made up at the end of the season), and eliminating divisional play for the season; the top eight teams from each conference advanced to the playoffs. The Jets finished the season with a record of 6–3 in sixth place in the American Football Conference. They defeated the Cincinnati Bengals and Los Angeles Raiders in the first two rounds of the playoffs to advance to their first AFC Championship Game. There, they fell to their division rivals, the Miami Dolphins, 14–0.

Offseason

Draft

Roster

Schedule

Regular season 

Note: Intra-division opponents are in bold text.

Season summary

Week 1 vs Dolphins

Week 2

Week 3

Week 4

Week 5

Week 6

Week 7 at Dolphins

Week 8

Week 9

Postseason

Wild Card

Divisional

Championship 

The Mud Bowl

Standings

Awards and honors 
 Freeman McNeil, NFL rushing leader

Footnotes and references 

New York Jets seasons
New York Jets
New York Jets season
1980s in Queens